On Sunday 26 May 2019, a vote was held to elect the Polish delegation to the European Parliament. Polish voters elected 52 MEPs, compared to 51 in the 2014 election. The increased number of MEPs is a result of the 2018 reapportionment of seats in the European Parliament. Following the United Kingdom's announcement, that it will participate in elections to the European Parliament on May 23, Poland will continue to be represented by 51 MEPs. The 52nd MEP will take up their mandate immediately after the UK leaves the European Union. Following the announcement of the election results, the National Electoral Commission indicated Dominik Tarczyński from Lesser Poland and Świętokrzyskie will take up the 52nd seat.

MEPs by European Political Group (as at 9 April 2019)

Lists 

Legally, Polish elections are contested by "election committees" (see Polish Wikipedia article) that are established by:
 one political party (Komitet Wyborczy, or KW), 
 a coalition of political parties (Koalicyjny Komitet Wyborczy, or KKW), 
 or nonpartisan voters themselves (Komitet Wyborczy Wyborców, or KWW)
These committees should register to the State Electoral Commission by 8 April 2019.

The committees have to send lists of five to ten candidates in each electoral district by 16 April. Each list has to be supported by signatures of at least 10,000 voters residing in the district. However, a committee that had collected enough signatures in at least 7 electoral districts were allowed to register lists in the remaining districts regardless of local support. Establishment of an independent committee required signatures of at least 1,000 registered voters.

There were 26 registered committees 6 of them registered candidates in all 13 constituencies.

Committees of political parties (Komitet Wyborczy) 
 KW Prawo i Sprawiedliwość
 KW Wiosna Roberta Biedronia

Committees of coalitions (Koalicyjny Komitet Wyborczy) 
 KKW Koalicja Europejska PO PSL SLD .N Zieloni
 KKW Lewica Razem - Partia Razem, Unia Pracy, RSS

Independent committees (Komitet Wyborczy Wyborców) 
 KWW Konfederacja KORWiN Braun Liroy Narodowcy
 KWW Kukiz'15

Electoral calendar 

The Electoral Commission has published a timetable of the election proceedings:

Leaders by constituency

Opinion polls

Results 

The Law and Justice party achieved its highest vote of any Polish elections at 45%.

Elected MEPs

Notes

References 

Poland
European Parliament elections in Poland
2019 elections in Poland